The Nor'Sea 27, or Norsea 27, is an American trailerable sailboat that was designed by Lyle Hess as cruiser and first built in 1976.

Production
The design was built by Heritage Marine, later renamed Nor'Sea Marine, in Dana Point, California, United States. Production was started in 1976, with 450 boats built, but it is now out of production.

The boats were sold complete and ready to sail and also as kits for amateur completion.

Design
Hess designed the boat in response to a specification by Dean Wixom, president of Heritage Marine, who was looking for a trailerable boat that could handle almost any ocean weather. Hess based the configuration on the traditional lines of the Norwegian Spitzgatter.

The Nor'Sea 27 is a recreational keelboat, built predominantly of fiberglass, with wood trim and a plywood-cored deck. It has a masthead sloop rig with a bowsprit, a spooned raked stem, a rounded transom, a keel and transom-hung rudder controlled by a tiller and a fixed long keel with a cutaway forefoot. It displaces .

The design has two cabin configurations, both with sleeping accommodation for four people. The center cockpit-aft cabin version has a double berth aft and a drop down dinette table that converts to a double berth in the bow. The aft cockpit configuration has a bow cabin and two berths aft, under the cockpit. Both have a galley located on the starboard side just forward of the companionway ladder, equipped with a two-burner stove and a sink. The head is located opposite the galley on the port side. The cabin has  of headroom.

Operational history
A review in Blue Water Boats noted, "the Nor'Sea 27 is a small but rugged pocket-cruiser with live-aboard comfort and seaworthiness at the heart of her design. Designer Lyle Hess was approached with the challenging brief to design a heavy weather, long distance cruiser which could be legally trailerable. Unfazed, Hess came up with this tough and traditionally styled 27-foot double-ender which is transportable between oceans if not strictly trailerable."

See also
List of sailing boat types

Related development
Bristol Channel Cutter
Falmouth Cutter 26
Nor'Sea 37

References

Keelboats
1970s sailboat type designs
Sailing yachts
Sailboat type designs by Lyle Hess
Sailboat types built by Nor'Sea Marine